tb1 is a Bosnian commercial television channel based in Trebinje, Bosnia and Herzegovina. The program is mainly produced in Serbian. The television station was established in 2016.

See also 
 O Kanal
 TV ONE HD

References

External links 
 Tb1 Televizija in Facebook 
 Communications Regulatory Agency of Bosnia and Herzegovina

Television stations in Bosnia and Herzegovina
Television channels and stations established in 2016